Behat Assembly constituency is one of the 403 constituencies of the Uttar Pradesh Legislative Assembly, India. It is a part of the Saharanpur district and one of five assembly constituencies in the Saharanpur Lok Sabha constituency.

Behat Assembly constituency came into existence in 2008 as a result of the "Delimitation of Parliamentary and Assembly Constituencies Order, 2008". Prior to 2008, this constituency was served / represented by the Muzaffarabad Assembly constituency.

Members of the Legislative Assembly

Election results

2022

2017

2012

See also
Government of Uttar Pradesh
List of Vidhan Sabha constituencies of Uttar Pradesh
Uttar Pradesh Legislative Assembly

Notes
 Behat Assembly constituency came into existence in 2008. Prior to 2008, this constituency was served / represented by Muzaffarabad Assembly constituency which now ceases to exist.

References

External links
 

Assembly constituencies of Uttar Pradesh
Politics of Saharanpur district
Constituencies established in 2008
2008 establishments in Uttar Pradesh